The 9-question Patient Health Questionnaire (PHQ-9) is a diagnostic tool introduced in 2001 to screen adult patients in a primary care setting for the presence and severity of depression. It rates depression based on the self-administered Patient Health Questionnaire (PHQ). The PHQ is part of Pfizer's larger suite of trademarked products, called the Primary Care Evaluation of Mental Disorders (PRIME-MD). The PHQ-9 takes less than 3 minutes to complete and simply scores each of the 9 DSM-IV criteria for depression based on the mood module from the original PRIME-MD. Primary care providers frequently use the PHQ-9 to screen for depression in patients.

History 
The PHQ-9 is the 9-question depression scale of PHQ. The PHQ is a self-administered version of the PRIME-MD, a screening tool that assesses 12 mental and emotional health disorders. The PHQ is 59-question instrument. It has modules on mood (PHQ-9), anxiety, alcohol, eating, and somatoform disorders. Dr. Robert L. Spitzer, Dr. Janet B.W. Williams, Dr. Kurt Kroenke, and colleagues from Columbia University developed the PHQ in the mid 1990s and the PHQ-9 in 1999 with a grant from Pfizer.

Survey items 
A patient may take the PHQ-9 in written form or be asked the survey items by clinic staff. The PHQ-9 questions are based on diagnostic criteria of depression from DSM-IV and ask about the patient's experience in the last 2 weeks. Questions are about the level of interest in doing things, feeling down or depressed, difficulty with sleeping, energy levels, eating habits, self-perception, ability to concentrate, speed of functioning and thoughts of suicide. Responses range from “0” (Not at all) to “3” (nearly every day). Clinicians may ask a 10th question that asks how difficult the problems that the prior questions ask about make it to function in daily life. The 10th question is not factored into the final score and clinicians may use it to gauge the patient's opinion of the level of impairment caused by their mental health. Factor analysis suggests that the items of the scale reflect 2 factors: a somatic and a cognitive/affective factor.

Interpretation of results 
The total sum of the responses suggests varying levels of depression. Scores range from 0 to 27. In general, a total of 10 or above is suggestive of the presence of depression. Listed below are PHQ-9 totals, the levels of depression that they relate to, and suggested treatment for each level of depression:

A provisional diagnosis of Major Depressive Disorder can be made by using responses to PHQ-9 questions to fulfill the diagnostic criteria of DSM-5. According to DSM-5, Major Depressive Disorder is likely if 5 or more of the 9 symptoms are present for “most of the day, nearly every day" in the past 2 weeks and one of the symptoms is depressed mood or little interest or pleasure in doing things (questions 1 and 2 on the PHQ-9). Any degree of suicidal thoughts counts toward this criteria. The symptoms must also cause significant distress and loss of function, and the symptoms must not be better explained by substance use or another medical or psychiatric condition. “Other” depression is diagnosed if there is significant impairment and/or distress in major areas of functioning, but the full criteria for any specific depressive disorder are not met. The PHQ-9 can be used to diagnose Major Depressive Syndrome, but Major Depressive Disorder must be diagnosed using additional clinical information (e.g. existence of past manic/hypomanic episode, bereavement, other mental disorder, effects of a medication or illness).

Clinicians may also use the PHQ-9 to evaluate treatments given for depression. A change of PHQ-9 score to less than 10 is considered a “partial response” to treatment and a change of PHQ-9 score to less than 5 is considered to be “remission.”

Validity and reliability 
Kroenke, Spitzer, and Williams conducted validity and reliability tests on the PHQ-9 in 2001. Reliability and tests found a Cronbach's alpha of 0.89 among 3,000 primary care patients and 0.86 among 3,000 OB-GYN patients. However, more recent studies found the scale to be not purely unidimensional (i.e. encompassing a somatic and cognitive/affective factor), suggesting the use of alternative reliability coefficients, but which also showed to be acceptable (e.g. in an Indian population: ώ-hierarchical = 0.72).

The test-retest reliability was assessed by the correlation between PHQ-9 scores obtained from in-person and phone interviews with the same patients. The correlation value obtained was 0.84.

In an assessment of construct validity, the correlation coefficient between the PHQ-9 and the SF-20 mental health scale was 0.73. To assess criterion validity, a mental health professional validated depression diagnoses from PHQ-9 scores from 580 participants, resulting in 88% sensitivity and 88% specificity.

The PHQ-9 showed acceptable psychometric properties in a rural Indian population.

The use of sumscores (i.e. summing the scores of each item) is supported by psychometric studies, but using techniques based on factor analysis are deemed more precise.

Applications 
The National Institute for Health and Clinical Excellence endorsed the PHQ-9 for measuring depression severity and responsiveness to treatment in adults in a primary care setting. The Behavioral Risk Factor Surveillance Survey (BRFSS), the National Health and Nutrition Examination Survey, the Medical Expenditure Panel Survey, the National Epidemiologic Survey on Alcohol and Related Conditions, the Medicare Health Support program, and the Millennium Cohort Study use the full PHQ-9 or a shortened form of it. The Veterans Administration, Department of Defense, and Kaiser Permanente adopted the PHQ-9 as a standard measure for depression screening. The PHQ-9 is also the most commonly used depression measure in the United Kingdom's National Health Service, which requires providers to use a depression screening instrument when treating depression.

Studies found the PHQ-9 is also useful for screening for depression in psychiatric clinics. Studies have used the PHQ-9 to study patients with diabetes, HIV-AIDS, chronic pain, arthritis, fibromyalgia, epilepsy, and substance abuse. It also is used in studies involving patients with physical disabilities as well as older adults, students, and adolescents. The PHQ-9 is available in over 30 languages and may be valid for use in different ethnicities. Pfizer owns the copyright of the PHQ-9 and allows it to be accessed for free.

Related instruments 
The PHQ-2 is a shortened version of the PHQ-9. It contains the first 2 questions of the PHQ-9 and takes less than a minute to administer. A score of 3 or greater on the PHQ-2 will generally lead to the subsequent administration of the PHQ-9. The Veterans Administration uses this method to screen for depression in patients.

The PHQ-8 consists of all of the PHQ-9 instruments except for the last question (suicidal thoughts). It is usually used in research settings in non-depressive patients. Researchers generally use the PHQ-8 because timing and resource restraints may leave researchers unable to intervene with study participants that indicate suicidal thoughts. The absence of the ninth question has little effect on scoring between the PHQ-8 and PHQ-9. A study found that scores between the two tests are highly correlated (r=0.998).

The PHQ-15 is the 15-question scale from the PHQ that asks about 15 symptoms relating to somatoform disorders. The questions on the PHQ-15 account for 90% of all symptoms that providers observe in the primary care setting Patients must rate how certain symptoms bothered them over the last month. Responses range from "not at all" (a score of 0) to "bothered a lot" (a score of 2). Higher scores on the PHQ-15 are strongly associated with functional impairment, disability and health care use.

The GAD-7 is a 7-question anxiety screening instrument developed in 2006 with a similar format to the PHQ-9. Total scores range from 0 to 21 with scores of 5, 10, and 15 indicating mild, moderate, and severe anxiety. Unlike the PHQ-9, clinicians use the GAD-7 to assess the severity of anxiety only. A clinical interview must be given to determine the presence and type of anxiety. The GAD-2 is a 2-question shortened version of the GAD-7 that uses the first two questions from the GAD-7. A total score that is greater than 3 indicates that a clinician should administer the full GAD-7 and conduct a clinical interview to assess the presence and type of anxiety disorder.

References

External links 
Official site

Anxiety screening and assessment tools
Depression screening and assessment tools